Winston Churchill Avenue is an arterial road in the British overseas territory of Gibraltar, and is the only road in and out of the territory, connecting it with Spain. Once the customs are crossed, the avenue becomes the dual carriageway CA-34 (former national road N-351).

Description
The northern end of the road starts at Gibraltar's border with Spain and passes Gibraltar International Airport at Victoria Stadium, which is Gibraltar's major sporting venue. The road intersects the airport's runway at surface level; movable barricades close when aircraft land or take off. In 2009, the Government of Gibraltar announced that a new highway will be built in order to avoid motor vehicles crossing the runway, which currently causes congestion. The new road, a dual carriageway, will link the customs checkpoint with Devil's Tower Road, crossing the east end of the airport runway underground, through a 350-metre tunnel.

Operation Flavius

In 1988, the then-Shell petrol station located on the road was the scene of a  controversial British military operation known as Operation Flavius. On 6 March, a Special Air Service (SAS) group shot dead three members of a Provisional Irish Republican Army (IRA) team, made up of Danny McCann, Seán Savage and Mairéad Farrell  while they were making their way to Spain on foot. The three were suspected of planning to kill members of a British military band with a car bomb outside the Governor of Gibraltar's official residence, The Convent. At the subsequent inquest into the deaths, members of the SAS team stated that they believed that the three were armed and that they were capable of remotely detonating the suspected bomb. The legality of the deaths was challenged in the European Court of Human Rights (see McCann and Others v United Kingdom), but it was eventually ruled that the killings were lawful.

References 

Streets in Gibraltar